Wheelchair tennis was contested at the 2011 Parapan American Games from November 13 to 18 at the Telcel Tennis Complex in Guadalajara, Mexico.

Medal summary

Medal table

Medal events

References

External links
2011 Parapan American Games – Wheelchair Tennis

Wheelchair tennis
Parapan American Games
2011